Arthur Fletcher is an American government official and the "Father of Affirmative Action".

Arthur Fletcher may also refer to:
 Arthur Fletcher (rugby league), English professional rugby league footballer
 Art Fletcher (1885–1950), American professional baseball player and manager
 Sir Arthur George Murchison Fletcher, Governor of Fiji